Faramarzan Rural District is a rural district (dehestan) in the Jenah District of Bastak County, Hormozgan Province, Iran. At the 2006 census, its population was 10,720, in 2,105 families.  The rural district has 10 villages.

References 

Rural Districts of Hormozgan Province
Bastak County